The 2017 Icelandic Super Cup was the 46th final in the Icelandic Super Cup, an annual game between the League champions and the Cup champions. The previous year FH were reigning League champions while Valur were Cup champions. The match was played at Hlíðarendi in Reykjavík 24 April.

Match details

References 

Football competitions in Iceland